This is a list of Italian sail frigates of the period 1640-1840:

Venice:
Cavalier Angelo
Pallade
Venere
Minerva - Wrecked c. 1792
Brillante 40? - Captured by France 1797 and renamed Montenotte, BU c. 1801
Bellona - Captured by Austria 1798
Medusa 40? - Captured by France 1797 and renamed Leoben, captured by Britain 1801
? - Captured by France 1797, renamed Muiron
Carrère - Captured by France 1797
Palma 40? - Captured by France 1797 and renamed Lonato
Cerere 40? - Captured by France 1797 and renamed Mantoue, captured by Turkey 1801
(6 frigates) - Captured and scuttled by France, 1797
Bellona 32 - Captured by Britain in the Battle of Lissa, 1811, and renamed Dover
Corona 40 - Captured by Britain in the Battle of Lissa, 1811, and renamed Daedalus
Carolina 32 - Took part in the Battle of Lissa, 1811

Naples:
Pallade 40 - Scuttled 1799
Minerva 40
Sibilla 40
Sirena 40
Aretusa 40
Leone (?)
Partenope 36 (1834)
Regina 50 (1840)

Sardinia:
San Michele 66 (1841)

Frigates, sail
Italian sailing